Kevin Richard Russell (born 12 January 1964) is a German singer and one of the three founding members of the rock band Böhse Onkelz.

Biography
His father is British, his mother is German. He was the band's lead singer from 1980 until the group broke up in 2005. Since 2012, he is the lead singer of the new band Veritas Maximus. In 2014, Böhse Onkelz reunited with Russell as their lead singer again.

In October 2010, Russell was sentenced to two years and three months in prison for his role as driver in a hit-and-run accident near Frankfurt, driving under the influence of drugs and seriously injuring two people.

Since 1986 Russell works as a tattoo artist. For example, the tattoo illustration on the cover of the 1992 album The Madman's Return of the German Eurodance group Snap! came from him.

References

External links

German male singers
German rock singers
German people of British descent
Musicians from Hamburg
1964 births
Living people